The Crossing of the Danube Cross was a Decoration established by Prince Carol I of Romania by Royal Decree 617 on 23 March 1878 to award individuals for outstanding leadership and contributions in the Romanian War of Independence.

The crossing of the Danube was one of the key events in the campaign, and it was one of the six events selected by Prince Carol to be immortalised in the six paintings commissioned from Johann Nepomuk Schönberg, and Austrian artist and war-correspondent.

The Decoration was later awarded to very few individuals who were deemed to have proven great leadership.

The Decoration was named after the Danube River where the Romanian Army fought the Ottoman Imperial Army.

The Decoration was abolished during the abolishment of the Romanian Monarchy in 1947 and was not reinstated as a Dynastic Decoration of the Decorations of the Romanian Royal House by Former King Michael I.

References

Orders, decorations, and medals of Romania